This is a list of things named after the English mathematician John Horton Conway (1937–2020). 

 Conway algebra – an algebraic structure introduced by Paweł Traczyk and Józef H. Przytycki
 Conway base 13 function – a function used as a counterexample to the converse of the intermediate value theorem
 Conway chained arrow notation – a notation for expressing certain extremely large numbers
Conway circle – a geometrical construction based on extending the sides of a triangle
 Conway criterion – a criterion for identifying prototiles that admit a periodic tiling
 Conway group – any of the groups Co0, Co1, Co2, or Co3
 Conway group Co1 – one of the sporadic simple groups discovered by Conway in 1968
 Conway group Co2 – one of the sporadic simple groups discovered by Conway in 1968
 Conway group Co3 – one of the sporadic simple groups discovered by Conway in 1968
 Conway knot – a curious knot having the same Alexander polynomial and Conway polynomial as the unknot
 Conway notation (knot theory) – a notation invented by Conway for describing knots in knot theory
 Conway polyhedron notation – notation invented by Conway used to describe polyhedra
 Conway polynomial (finite fields) – an irreducible polynomial used in finite field theory
 Conway puzzle – a packing problem invented by Conway using rectangular blocks
 Conway sphere – a 2-sphere intersecting a given knot in the 3-sphere or 3-ball transversely in four points
 Conway triangle notation – notation which allows trigonometric functions of a triangle to be managed algebraically
 Conway's 99-graph problem – a problem invented by Conway asking if a certain undirected graph exists
 Conway's constant – a constant used in the study of the Look-and-say sequence
 Conway's dead fly problem – does there exist a Danzer set whose points are separated at a bounded distance from each other?
 Conway's Game of Life – a cellular automaton defined on the two-dimensional orthogonal grid of square cells
 Conway's Soldiers – a one-person mathematical game resembling peg solitaire
 Conway's thrackle conjecture – In graph theory, the conjecture that no thrackle has more edges than vertices
 Alexander–Conway polynomial – a knot invariant which assigns a polynomial to each knot type in knot theory

References

Conway
List of things